State Road 295 (SR 295) is a major highway in the Pensacola metropolitan area. Locally, SR 295 is also called Navy Boulevard, New Warrington Road, and Fairfield Drive. The southern terminus is at the entrance to Pensacola Naval Air Station, and the northern terminus is at an intersection with Fairfield Drive, Ninth Avenue (SR 289) and 12th Avenue in the city of Pensacola. This roadway is the main artery between southwestern Escambia County and the city of Pensacola.

Major intersections

Related routes

West Pensacola spur

A spur on New Warrington Road in West Pensacola is also signed as SR 295. The spur is designed as a connection from northbound SR 295 and to southbound SR 295 to US 90.

State Road 752

A one-mile-long spur from SR 295 (along Texar Drive) to Ninth Avenue is signed east–west as State Road 752. While SR 295 has a diamond interchange with Interstate 110 (I-110), SR 752 does not connect with the Interstate highway at all.

References

External links

FDOT Map of Escambia County (including SRs 295 & 752)
Florida 295 and 752 (AARoads)

295
295